The 2004 FIRA Women's European Championship took place at grounds in and around the Midi-Pyrénées region of France (near Toulouse) between 30 April to 9 May. Pool A reverted to a single eight nation knockout, while Pool B was a round-robin. France repeated Netherlands feat of winning as hosts.

Pool A

Bracket

First round

Plate semi-finals

Semi-finals

7th/8th

Plate final

3rd/4th place

Final

Pool B

Final table

Results

See also
Women's international rugby

External links
FIRA website

2004
2004 rugby union tournaments for national teams
International women's rugby union competitions hosted by France
2003–04 in French rugby union
2003–04 in European women's rugby union
rugby union
May 2004 sports events in France